Havran is a town and county of Balıkesir Province in the Aegean region of Turkey. According to the 2010 census, the population of the county is 28,050 of which 10,766 live in the town of Havran.

The county has traditionally produced cheese and a fruit drink called Şerbet.

Until the 1920 the population was mix of Turks, Greeks, and Tatar (refugees) with small numbers of Jews and Armenians.

Notes

References

External links
 District governor's official website 
 Road map of Havran and environs
 Another road map of Havran and environs
 Various images of Havran

Populated places in Balıkesir Province
Districts of Balıkesir Province